Ziveh (also Romanized as Zīveh) is a village in Angut-e Gharbi Rural District of the Central District of Ungut County, Ardabil province, Iran. Prior to the formation of the county, the village and rural district were in Angut District of Germi County for the following three censuses: at the 2006 census, its population was 1,130 in 240 households. The following census in 2011 counted 1,425 people in 336 households. The latest census in 2016 showed a population of 1,412 people in 375 households; it was the largest village in its rural district.

References 

Populated places in Ardabil Province